Lorenzo Fieschi (died 13 Feb 1519) was a Roman Catholic prelate who served as Bishop of Mondovi (1512–1519), Bishop of Ascoli Piceno (1510–1512), and Bishop of Brugnato (1502–1510).

Biography
On 28 September 1502, Lorenzo Fieschi was appointed during the papacy of Pope Alexander VI as Bishop of Brugnato.
On 14 December 1502, he was consecrated bishop by Domenico Valdettaro, Bishop of Acci, with Domenico Vaccari, Bishop of Ventimiglia, and Giacomo della Rovere, Bishop of Mileto, serving as co-consecrators. 
On 24 May 1510, he was appointed during the papacy of Pope Julius II as Bishop of Ascoli Piceno. On 15 October 1512, he was appointed during the papacy of Pope Julius II as Bishop of Mondovi. He served as Bishop of Mondovi until his death on 13 February 1519.

References

External links and additional sources
 (for Chronology of Bishops) 
 (for Chronology of Bishops) 
 (for Chronology of Bishops) 
 (for Chronology of Bishops) 
 (for Chronology of Bishops) 
 (for Chronology of Bishops) 

16th-century Italian Roman Catholic bishops
Bishops appointed by Pope Alexander VI
Bishops appointed by Pope Julius II
Bishops of Mondovì
1519 deaths
Fieschi family
16th-century Genoese people